In Greek mythology, Dyssebeia was the spirit and personification of impiety and ungodliness, as opposed to Eusebeia. Her Roman equivalent was Impietas.

Family 
According to Aeschylus, Dyssebeia was the mother of Hybris."I have a timely word of advice: arrogance (hybris) is truly the child of impiety (dyssebia), but from health of soul comes happiness, dear to all, much prayed for."

Mythology 
Dyssebeia (Impietas) was called upon by Hera when the goddess was angry towards Heracles, Zeus's illegitimate son."One in deep darkness buried, far down below the place of banishment of guilty souls, will I call up – the goddess Discordia/ Eris (Discord), whom a huge cavern, barred by a mountain, guards; I will bring her forth, and drag out from the deepest realm of Dis/ Hades whatever thou hast left; hateful Scelus (Crime) shall come and reckless Impietas/ Dyssebeia (Impiety), stained with kindred blood, Error/ Ate, and Furor/ Lyssa (Madness), armed ever against itself – this, this be the minister of my smarting wrath!"

Notes

References 

 Aeschylus, translated in two volumes. 2. Eumenides by Herbert Weir Smyth, Ph. D. Cambridge, MA. Harvard University Press. 1926. Online version at the Perseus Digital Library. Greek text available from the same website.
 Lucius Annaeus Seneca, Tragedies. Translated by Miller, Frank Justus. Loeb Classical Library Volumes. Cambridge, MA, Harvard University Press; London, William Heinemann Ltd. 1917. Online version at theoi.com.
 Lucius Annaeus Seneca, Tragoediae. Rudolf Peiper. Gustav Richter. Leipzig. Teubner. 1921. Latin text available at the Perseus Digital Library.

Greek goddesses
Personifications in Greek mythology